is a song that has become an Internet meme in Japan. Lyrics were later written for this version of the song, and then posted to YouTube on February 6, 2007, by the user PiggKingg and then posted in full on February 14. The song describes the singer reminiscing about his childhood and friends, particularly pretending to be Ultraman/Ultraseven with them, while realizing his life and theirs is nothing like what it used to be.

History 

The first posting of "Omoide wa Okkusenman!" with vocals by an individual known as Gom occurred on YouTube on February 19, 2007. The earliest postings of the song on Nico Nico Douga were on March 6, 2007, and sung by an individual (or group) known as "CHROMES", followed by Gomu's minutes later. The song has since become an Internet meme in Japan and the rest of the world. Its entrenching in the Nico Nico Douga culture has given it a permanent placement Kumikyoku Nico Nico Douga medleys, alongside the similar song "Air Man ga Taosenai".

The original writer of the song's lyrics is unknown. When Nico Nico Douga attempted to discover the song's proper writer to include the song in one of their CDs, their campaign was unsuccessful and determined that it was written as a collaboration of users in the Nico Nico Douga and Japanese internet communities.

Commercial releases 
The popularity of "Okkusenman!" in Japan led to various covers on Nico Nico Douga and YouTube as well as commercial releases. Gomu's version was included as a track on the album  released July 9, 2008. At the 2008 Animelo Summer Live concert, Hironobu Kageyama, Masaaki Endoh, Hiroshi Kitadani, Yoshiki Fukuyama, and Aki Misato performed a cover version of "Okkusenman!" to begin the second day's setlist. In 2009, JAM Project contributed a cover version of "Okkusenman!" to the album  as its bonus track.

Notes

References

External links 
 The original posting on YouTube
 The original animation on Nico Nico Douga

Internet memes
Japanese songs
Mega Man
Video game memes